1972 in Japanese football is an overview of events relating to football in the Japanese culture.

Japan Soccer League

Division 1

Division 2

Japanese Regional Leagues

Emperor's Cup

National team

Results

Players statistics

External links

 
Seasons in Japanese football